CIZZ-FM (98.9 FM) is a radio station in Red Deer, Alberta. Owned by Stingray Group, it broadcasts a classic rock format branded as Z98.9.

As CKRD-FM, the station was a network affiliate of CBC Stereo from 1977 to 1981.

In April 2021, CIZZ began to serve as the originating station for Rock of the West, a networked evening program airing on Stingray's classic rock stations in Alberta and British Columbia. It is hosted by the station's afternoon host Travis Currah, and modelled after the Rock of the Atlantic program networked by CFRQ-FM.

References

External links 

  

IZZ
IZZ
IZZ
Radio stations established in 1965
1965 establishments in Alberta
Former Corus Entertainment subsidiaries